The Schar Center is a multi-purpose arena in Elon, North Carolina on the campus of Elon University. It is home to the school's men's and women's basketball and volleyball teams and replaced Alumni Gym in 2018. The arena's capacity is 5,100.

References

Elon Phoenix
Basketball venues in North Carolina
College basketball venues in the United States
Indoor arenas in North Carolina
2018 establishments in North Carolina
Sports venues completed in 2018
Sports venues in the Piedmont Triad
College volleyball venues in the United States